Florence Klotz (October 28, 1920 – November 1, 2006) was an American costume designer on Broadway and on film.

Biography
Born in Brooklyn, New York, she graduated from Parsons School of Design, and went to work painting fabrics for Brooks Costumes. Originally named as Kathrina Klotz, she later changed her name to "Florence" and was often nicknamed "Flossie".

Klotz began her career in 1951 as an assistant to Irene Sharaff, who designed the costumes for Richard Rodgers and Oscar Hammerstein II's The King and I  It was there she met her companion for the next half century Ruth Mitchell who later would co-produce Broadway shows with Hal Prince.

She worked with Jerome Robbins, designing costumes for Madama Butterfly for the Lyric Opera of Chicago and the film version of A Little Night Music. She became friendly with actress Elizabeth Taylor on the set of this last venture, for which Klotz was nominated for an Academy Award — Taylor asked Klotz to design the lavender dress she wore for her wedding to Senator John Warner in 1976.

Other musicals she designed for included City of Angels, On the Twentieth Century, It's a Bird... It's a Plane... It's Superman, Grind, and The Little Foxes.

Costume design
Klotz designed costumes for many Broadway productions, including:
Kiss of the Spider Woman
City of Angels
Jerry's Girls
On the Twentieth Century
Side by Side by Sondheim
Pacific Overtures
A Little Night Music
Follies
It's a Bird... It's a Plane... It's Superman
The Best Laid Plans
The Owl and the Pussycat
Nobody Loves an Albatross
Never Too Late
Take Her, She's Mine

Death
Klotz died at her Manhattan home of cardiac arrest, four days after her 86th birthday. She is survived by her niece, Suzanne DeMarco. Klotz's partner, producer and stage manager Ruth Mitchell, died in 2000.

Awards

All of the Tony Awards Klotz won were for musicals directed by Hal Prince, with whom she had a long association.

1995: Show Boat
1993: Kiss of the Spider Woman: The Musical
1985: Grind
1976: Pacific Overtures
1973: A Little Night Music
1972: Follies

She won the Drama Desk Award for Outstanding Costume Design five times, three L.A. Critic Circle Awards, and two Outer Critics Circle Awards. In 2002, she received the Patricia Zipprodt Award from the Fashion Institute of Technology; and in 2005, she won the Irene Sharaff Lifetime Achievement Award.

References

External links

Florence Klotz obituary, San Jose Mercury News

1920 births
2006 deaths
American costume designers
Women costume designers
American LGBT artists
People from Brooklyn
Drama Desk Award winners
Tony Award winners
Ballet designers
Parsons School of Design alumni
20th-century American LGBT people